Veerangana Durgawati Wildlife Sanctuary is a wildlife sanctuary in Damoh district of Madhya Pradesh, India. Named after Rani Durgavati, a queen of the Gondi people, and covering an area of only 24 sq km, the sanctuary was notified by the Government of Madhya Pradesh in 1996.

Location 
The sanctuary is located in the district of Damoh in the Indian state of Madhya Pradesh. It lies on either side of the State Highway 36 and lies between the towns of Damoh and Jabalpur.

Principal fauna 
The sanctuary hosts 18 species of mammals, including the leopard, wolf, jackal, Indian fox, the striped hyena and sloth bear besides several species of deer. Besides these, the sanctuary is also home to 177 species of birds, 16 species of fish and reptiles and 10 species of amphibians.

Landscape and flora 
The sanctuary has a varied landscape consisting of hills, valleys and plains with several streams flowing through them, some of which form pools of water. The vegetation is predominantly tropical mixed dry deciduous forest and some teak forests with trees accounting for 70 of the 121 species of plants found here. Pterocarpus marsupium, Terminalia alata, Anogeissus latifolia, Madhuca indica, Butea monosperma and Lagerstroemia parviflora are the most common trees in the sanctuary.
The Singorgarh fort are located within the sanctuary.

References

Wildlife sanctuaries in Madhya Pradesh
Damoh district
1996 establishments in Madhya Pradesh
Protected areas established in 1996